Interstate 440 may refer to:
Interstate 440 (Arkansas), a bypass of northeastern Little Rock
Interstate 440 (North Carolina), a bypass route in Raleigh
Interstate 440 (Oklahoma), abolished—now part of Interstate 44
Interstate 440 (Tennessee), a bypass of Nashville, now long since overgrown by the city

40-4
4